This is a list of foreign players in Liga FPD. The following players:
have played at least one official game for their respective clubs.
are listed as squad members for the current.
have not been capped for the Costa Rica national team at any level.
includes uncapped players with dual nationality.

In italic: Players currently signed, but have yet to play a league match.

In Bold: Current foreign Liga de Fútbol de Primera División. players and their present team.

Naturalized players 
  Ricardo Saprissa – Orión F.C.
  Odir Jacques – Saprissa
  Víctor Núñez – Alajuelense, Saprissa, Cartagines, Herediano, Liberia Mía, Santos de Guápiles
  Hernán Bolaños
  Nilton Nóbrega – Saprissa, Herediano 
  Alexandre Guimaraes – Saprissa, Municipal Puntarenas, Turrialba

Africa – CAF

Cameroon  
 Alain Ekwe – Puntarenas
 Simon Pasteur – Liberia Mía

Congo  
 Kanga Nzeza – Cartaginés

Equatorial Guinea  
 Danny Quendambú – Herediano, UCR, San Carlos

Guinea  
 Joao Johanning – Perez Zeledon, Club Sport Uruguay

Kenya  
 Charles Otieno – Herediano
 Austin Makacha – Herediano
 Titus Mulama – Herediano

Sierra Leone  
 Michael Tommy – Herediano, Belén, Puntarenas, Cartaginés, Liberia Mía

South Africa  
 Kiki Kabanga – Cartaginés

South America (CONMEBOL)

Argentina 
 Joaquin Aguirre – Cartaginés
 Santiago Aloi – Municipal Liberia
 Lautaro Ayala - Guadalupe
 Pablo Azcurra - Pérez Zeledón
 Maximiliano Badell – Herediano 
 Lucio Barroca - Pérez Zeledón
 Patricio Gómez Barroche – Herediano
 Alejandro Cabral - Saprissa 
 Jonathan Camio - Carmelita
 Facundo Crespo – Pérez Zeledón, Cartaginés
 Jorge Drovandi – Herediano
 Alexis Esparza – Cartaginés
 Hernan Fener – Cartaginés, Pérez Zeledón
 Gustavo Fernández – Saprissa 
 José Luis García – Municipal Liberia
 Lucas Giovagnoli - Grecia
 Ismael Gómez - San Carlos, Jicaral 
 Marcelo Gómez – Alajuelense
 Lucas Emanuel Gómez – Brujas, Alajuelense, Cartaginés
 Manuel González - San Carlos
 Nelson Emanuel González – Cartaginés
 Nicolás Hernández – Alajuelense
 Andrés Imperiale – Saprissa 
 Pablo Alejandro Izaguirre – Alajuelense
 Daniel Juárez – Alajuelense
 Javier Liendo - Pérez Zeledón
 Esteban Espíndola López – Saprissa 
 Adrián Mahía – Saprissa
 Diego Joaquín País – Pérez Zeledón, Cartaginés, San Carlos 
 Leonel Peralta - Grecia
 Claudio Daniel Pérez - San Carlos 
 Sebastián Pol – Cartaginés
 Leandro Gastón Rodríguez  - Pérez Zeledón
 Emiliano Romay – Saprissa 
 Rodrigo Salomón – Pérez Zeledón
 Héctor Sanabria – Pérez Zeledón
 Ariel Segalla – Cartaginés
 Juan Ignacio Sills – Alajuelense
 Fernando Gaston Soler – Pérez Zeledón
 Mariano Torres – Saprissa
 José Luis Zelaye – Cartaginés
 Facundo Zabala – Alajuelense

Bolivia 
 Carlos Saucedo – Saprissa

Brazil 
 Anderson Andrade Antunes – Brujas, Herediano, Alajuelense , Municipal Liberia, Cartaginés 
 Paulo Cézar - Grecia
 Leandro da Silva – Alajuelense
 Iago Soares  – Alajuelense
 Anderson Leite – Saprissa
 Rodinei Martins – Herediano, Alajuelense
 Ricardo Mion Varella Costa – Saprissa
 Luciano Xavier Cunha – Alajuelense
 Nilton Nóbrega – Herediano
 Marcelo Sarvas – Alajuelense
 Paulo César Rodrigues Lima – Brujas
 Leandro Barrios Rita dos Martires – Herediano, Alajuelense
 Adonis Hilario – Saprissa, Herediano, Guanacasteca
 Jorge Barbosa – Santos de Guápiles, Brujas, Puntarenas F.C., Cartaginés, Barrio México, UCR
 Rafael Gomes de Oliveira – Herediano
 Ismael Nery de Souza  – Saprissa
 Pablo Rodrigues - Guanacasteca
 Kennedy Rocha Pereira - Jicaral 
 Enrique Moura – Pérez Zeledón
 Tássio Maia - Saprissa

Chile  
 Horacio Díaz Luco – Herediano, Limón Sprite, Cartaginés, Municipal Turrialba, Municipal Limón  
 Ismael Fuentes – Santos de Guápiles
 Alejandro González – Alajuelense
 Carlos González – Saprissa
 Eduardo Quintanilla – San Carlos
 Rubén Rodríguez-Peña – Herediano
 Adrián Rojas – Cartaginés
 Nino Rojas – Alajuelense
 Carlos Soza - Limón
 Francisco Ugarte - Limón

Colombia  
 Elier Aponzá – Pérez Zeledón
 César Arias – Belen
 Carlos Asprilla – Herediano
 Jose Balanta- Municipal Liberia
 Ronald Benavides - Limón
 Sebastián Bermúdez - UCR
 Oscar Briceño – Herediano
 Fernando Cárdenas - UCR
 Sebastian Gonzales – 	Belén FC, Guadalupe
 Wilmer Cabrera – Herediano
 Jhon Culma – Brujas
 Jhon Ibargüen - UCR
 Neco Martínez – Guanacasteca
 Junior Murillo - Limón
 Daniel Ocampo - UCR
 Carlos Palacios - Limón
 Nixon Perea – Alajuelense
 Roberto Polo – Brujas
 Sergio Reina – Cartaginés
 Andres Riascos - UCR
 Omar Royero – Pérez Zeledón, Liberia Mía, Santos de Guápiles, Carmelita, UCR
 Ricardo Steer – Pérez Zeledón, Brujas
 Carlos Salazar – Alajuelense
  Luis Martínez - Guanacasteca

Ecuador  
 Jefferson Hurtado – Alajuelense

Paraguay  
 Lauro Cazal - Pérez Zeledón
 Óscar Nadin Díaz González – Herediano
 Luis Rodríguez - UCR

Perú  
 Alfonso Yañez – Saprissa
 Mario Parreaguirre – Herediano
 Braulio Valverde – La Libertad
 Sigifredo Vargas – San Ramón
 José Chicona – San Ramón
 Reinaldo Jaime – Cartaginés
 Manuel Lobatón – Saprissa
 Carlos Izquierdo – Turrialba, San Ramón
 Augusto Palacios – Cartaginés
 Alberto Castillo – Herediano
 Aguinaldo Otta – Pérez Zeledón
 Karl Wiliams – Saprissa
 Pascual Ramirez – Cartaginés(Reserve)
 Carlos Salazar – Cartaginés(Reserve)
 Mauricio Zumaeta – Cartaginés(Reserve)

Uruguay  
 Leonardo Abelenda – A.D. San Carlos
 Carim Adippe – Cartaginés
 Edgardo Baldi – Alajuelense 
 Rafael Bianchi – Herediano
 Sergio Blanco - Ramonense
 José Cancela – Herediano, Saprissa, Belén, Liberia Mía, Pérez Zeledón
 James Cantero – Club Sport Uruguay de Coronado
 Paolo Cardozo – Cartaginés
 Claudio Ciccia – Alajuelense, Cartaginés, Puntarenas F.C.
 Sebastián Diana – Saprissa
 Gustavo Ferreyra – Saprissa
 Sebastián Fuentes – Puntarenas F.C.
 Carlos Macchi – Alajuelense
 Miguel Mansilla – Saprissa , Puntarenas F.C.
 Edgar Martínez – Santos de Guápiles
 Julio Modernell – Puntarenas F.C.
 Juan Manuel Morales – Saprissa
 Néstor Fabián Morais – Pérez Zeledón
 Mario Orta – Herediano, Saprissa
 César Pellegrín – Herediano
 Álvaro Enrique Peña – Puntarenas F.C.
 Miguel Ángel Pereira (Oso) - Saprissa
 Gerardo Priori - Turrialba 
 Fabrizio Ronchetti - A.D. San Carlos, Santos de Guápiles
 Joaquin Santellan - Jicaral 
 Jonathan Soto - A.D. San Carlos
 Pablo Tiscornia – Herediano, Cartaginés, Puntarenas F.C.
 Nicolás Vigneri – Cartaginés

Venezuela  
 Roberto Brito Jr.  – Puntarenas F.C.
 Víctor Pérez -  Grecia

North and Central America, Caribbean (CONCACAF)

Bahamas 
 Kamal Degregory – Belén

Belize 
 Deon McCaulay – Puntarenas F.C.
 Shane Orio – Puntarenas F.C., Ramonense

Cuba 
 Frank Mejías – Club Sport La Libertad
 Marcel Hernández Campanioni - Cartaginés

El Salvador  
 Lester Blanco – San Carlos, Jicaral 
 Norberto Huezo – Herediano
 Alexander Larin – Herediano
 Carlos Antonio Meléndez – Asociación Deportiva San Miguel	
 Conrado Miranda – Uruguay, Club Sport La Libertad 
 Nildeson – Herediano
 Eliseo Quintanilla – Alajuelense
 Luis Ramírez Zapata – Cartaginés
 José Sigifredo Espinoza (Bucky) – Alajuelense

Guatemala 
 Sixto Betancourt – Cartaginés
 Moises Hernandez – Saprissa
 Rafael Morales – Saprissa
 Ángelo Padilla – Puntarenas F.C., Carmelita, Municipal Liberia
 Ignacio González (Nacho)  – Saprissa

Haiti 
 Roody Lormera – Puntarenas F.C.
 Nael Elysee - Grecia

Honduras 
 Ciro Paulino Castillo- Alajuelense, Cartaginés
 Rubilio Castillo - Saprissa
 Arnold Cruz – Cartaginés
 Juan Carlos Espinoza – Alajuelense
 Danilo Galindo – Herediano
 Henry Figueroa - Alajuelense
 José Roberto Figueroa – Cartaginés
 Eugenio Dolmo Flores – Alajuelense
 Luis Garrido – Alajuelense
 Nahamán González  – Alajuelense, Herediano 
 Amado Guevara – Saprissa
 José Güity – Herediano
 Alexander López - Alajuelense
 Emil Martínez – Alajuelense
 Saúl Martínez – Herediano
 Ninrrol Medina – Saprissa
 Ramón Núñez – Alajuelense
 César Obando – Cartaginés
 Jerry Palacios – Alajuelense
 Roger Rojas – Alajuelense
 Nicolás Suazo – Herediano
 Christian Santamaría – Cartaginés
 Ángel Tejeda – Pérez Zeledón, Alajuelense

Jamaica  
 Javon East - San Carlos 
 Maalique Foster - Alajuelense
 Craig Foster - Pérez Zeledón

Mexico 
 Alejandro Abasolo – Belén, Guadalupe
 Manuel Arce - Guadalupe
 Omar Arellano – Herediano
 Julio César Cruz – Belén, Herediano, San Carlos 
 Juan Felipe Delgadillo - Cartaginés
 Alberto García Jr. – Belén
 Julio Cruz González - Cartaginés
 Sebastián Fassi – Belén
 Francisco Fonseca – Santos de Guápiles
 Diego Franco – Belén
 Juan de Dios Hernández  – Alajuelense
 Luis Omar Hernandez – Herediano
 Luis Ángel Landín – Herediano
 Édgar Gerardo Lugo - Herediano
 Aldo Magaña - Herediano, Grecia
 Luis Ernesto Michel – Saprissa
 Alfonso Nieto – Herediano
 Julio César Pardini – Herediano
 César de la Peña – Belén
 Moctezuma Serrato – Herediano

Nicaragua  
 Byron Bonilla - Cartaginés, Grecia
 Luis Fernando Copete – AS Puma Generaleña
 Francisco Flores - Santos de Guápiles
 Jason Ingram - Santos de Guápiles
 Raúl Leguías – AS Puma Generaleña
 Marlon López – Santos de Guápiles
 Justo Lorente – Municipal Liberia
 Danny Téllez – Guanacasteca
 Hamilton West – Guanacasteca

Panama  
 Jorman Israel Aguilar - San Carlos 
 Empanada Arosemena - Libertad 
 Abdiel Arroyo – Alajuelense
 Nelson Barahona - Cartaginés
 Ricardo Buitrago – Cartaginés
 Roberto Brown – Cartaginés
 Diógenes Cáceres – Herediano
 Ronaldo Dinolis - Santos de Guápiles
 Richard Dixon - Limón
 Luis Gallardo – Herediano
 Freddy Góndola – Alajuelense
 Victor Griffith - Santos de Guápiles
 Armando Gun – Alajuelense
 Brunet Hay – Pérez Zeledón, Herediano, Belén
 Amílcar Henríquez – Santacruceña
 Adolfo Machado – Saprissa, Alajuelense
 Óscar McFarlane – Pérez Zeledón
 Víctor René Mendieta Jr. – Santacruceña
 Víctor Miranda – UCR
 Jaime Penedo – Saprissa
 Pércival Piggott – Liberia
 Armando Polo – Pérez Zeledón
 Álex Rodríguez – Pérez Zeledón
 Roberto Tyrrel – Alajuelense
 Alejandro Vélez – Guanacasteca
 Amir Waithe - Carmelita
 Humberto Ward - Limón

Saint Lucia  
 Kurt Frederick – Alajuelense

Trinidad and Tobago  
 Michael Maurice – Herediano
 Aubrey David – Saprissa

United States  
 Javier Clavijo - Limón
 Roy Lassiter – Alajuelense, Carmelita
 David Quesada – Alajuelense, Ramonense, Saprissa
 Kurt Kelley - Saprissa, Belén, Goicoechea and Carmelita

Ocenia (ONC)

New Zealand 
 Maksim Manko – Santos de Gualipes

Europe (UEFA)

Czech Republic 
 Pavel Karoch – Alajuelense
 Ladislav Jakubec – Alajuelense
 Tomáš Poštulka – Carmelita

Denmark 
 Jacob Sloth Bennedsen – Cartaginés

England 
 Antonio Pedroza  - Herediano

Switzerland 
 Thomas Alder – Carmelita

France 
 Román Calvo - UCR
 Michel Gafour – Liberia Mía
 Jacques Rémy – Liberia Mía
 Bruno Savry – Liberia Mía

Serbia 
 Boris Balinović – Limón, Liberia
 Miroslav Bjeloš – Limón
 Vladimir Vujasinović – Limón, Liberia
 Zoran Zec – Limón

Spain   
 Aram Pazos – Municipal Liberia
 Lázaro Candal – Club Sport La Libertad
 Francisco Javier De Lucas – Ramonense, San Carlos
 Nicolás Nogales – Turrialba, Sagrada Familia

Slovakia 
 Josef Miso – Herediano, Alajuelense

Notes

References

External links
 
 

Liga FPD
Costa Rica
 
Association football player non-biographical articles